Evil Woman may refer to:

"Evil Woman" (Crow song), later covered by Black Sabbath
"Evil Woman" (Electric Light Orchestra song), 1975
"Evil Woman", a song by Greg Page from his 1998 debut album
"Evil Woman", a song by Guy Darrell, later covered by Spooky Tooth, Canned Heat, and Quiet Riot
"Evil Woman", a song by Zeke from the album Death Alley
"Evil Woman", a song by The Doobie Brothers from their album The Captain and Me
The international name for the film Saving Silverman